The Finnish government recognized Egypt on 8 April 1922 and diplomatic relations were established. However, no diplomatic mission was established at that point. In January 1942, as the Finnish government took part in the German invasion of the Soviet Union, the Egyptian government broke diplomatic relations with Helsinki.

Diplomatic relations were reestablished on 15 February 1947 at a Legation level, but no diplomatic mission was actually established. In 1954 the Finnish Ambassador to Italy was appointed non-resident Minister Plenipotentiary to Egypt.  On 1 July 1959 relations were elevated to Embassy level, and the Finnish Embassy was opened in September.

Finnish Minister to Egypt (residing in Rome)
 Asko Ivalo 1954-1959

Finnish Ambassadors to Egypt
Atle Asanti: 1959-1962
Osmo Orkomies: 1962-1966
Soini Palasto: 1966-1969
Pekka Malinen: 1969-1974
Joel Pekuri: 1975-1978
Björn-Olof Alholm: 1979-1980
Olli Auero: 1980-1984
Mauri Eggert: 1984-1987
Antti Hynninen: 1987-1989
Elisabeth Tigerstedt-Tähtelä: 1990-1992
Garth Castrén: 1992-1997
Aapo Pölhö: 1998-2002
Hannes Mäntyvaara: 2002-2005 
Hannu Halinen: 2005-2009
Roberto Tanzi-Albi: 2009–2013
Tuula Yrjölä: 2013-2016
Laura Kansikas-Debraise: 2017-2021
Pekka Kosonen: 2021-present

External links
 Emabassy of Finland, Cairo: History of the mission and list of Ambassadors

Ambassadors of Finland to Egypt
Finland
Egypt